Krivoy Buzan is a rural locality (a selo) in Vatazhensky Selsoviet, Krasnoyarsky District, Astrakhan Oblast, Russia. The population was 758 as of 2010. There are 10 streets.

Geography 
Krivoy Buzan is located 20 km east of Krasny Yar (the district's administrative centre) by road. Pushkino is the nearest rural locality.

References 

Rural localities in Krasnoyarsky District, Astrakhan Oblast